Diana Harrison Wall is the Founding Director of the School of Global Environmental Sustainability, a Distinguished Biology Professor, and Senior Research Scientist at the Natural Resource Ecology Laboratory at Colorado State University. She is an environmental scientist and a soil ecologist and her research has focussed on the Antarctic McMurdo Dry Valleys. Wall investigates ecosystem processes, soil biodiversity and ecosystem services and she is interested in how these are impacted by global change. The Wall Valley was named after her in recognition of her research in the McMurdo Dry Valleys. Wall is a globally recognised leader and speaker on life in Antarctica and climate change.

Early life and education 
Wall was born in North Carolina where she attended high school. After graduating high school she moved to Lexington, Kentucky for undergraduate college. Her interest in nematodes began during her undergraduate degree when she worked on nematode parasites in horses and birds. She completed a Bachelor of Arts degree in Biology at the University of Kentucky. She also completed her PhD on plant pathology from the University of Kentucky in 1971.

Career and impact 
Wall began work as a postdoctoral researcher at University of California-Riverside in 1972 where she began researching the function and biological diversity of soil ecosystems. In 1976 she began work in the Department of Nematology as an Assistant Research Nematologist. She continued to work at UC-Riverside for a further seventeen years before becoming a Professor in the Department of Nematology. Throughout this period, she was the Associate Director of the Drylands Research Institute for two years the Associate Program Director of the National Science Foundation in Washington, DC for one year.

Wall began working at Colorado State University in 1993. At this time she became a Professor in the Department of Forest, Rangeland, and Watershed Stewardship (until 2006), the Associate Dean for Research in the Natural Resources College (until-2000) and the Director of the Natural Resource Ecology Laboratory (until 2005). Wall became a Professor in the Department of Biology at CSU in 2006 and was key in establishing the School of Global Environmental Sustainability at CSU in 2008.

Wall began working in Antarctica's Dry Valleys in 1989. Since then she has conducted long-term soil ecology research in this region. Her work has changed our understanding of soil ecology in the Antarctic by drawing links between soil process and diversity to environmental conditions above the ground. Wall has described invertebrate soil communities in the Dry Valleys of Victoria Land and hers were among the first models of habitat suitability for specific invertebrate species in the Dry Valleys.

Wall has held the position of President of the American Institute of Biological Sciences, the Ecological Society of America, the Association of Ecosystem Research Centers and the Society of Nematologists. Wall was also the Chair of the Council of Scientific Society Presidents in 2003. Wall was elected a member of the National Academy of Sciences.

Awards and honors 

Wall has received the 2012 Mines Medal from the South Dakota School of Mines and Technology, the Scientific Committee for Antarctic Research President's Medal for Excellence in Antarctic Research, and the Soil Ecology Society Professional Achievement Award.

She was named a Fellow of the Aldo Leopold Leadership Program in 1999 and she was selected as the 2012 Tansley Lecturer of the British Ecological Society.

Wall won the Tyler Prize for Environmental Achievement in 2013 and was inducted into the Colorado Women's Hall of Fame in 2014 and the American Academy of Arts and Sciences. She is a Fellow of the American Association for the Advancement of Science in 2014. Wall was awarded the University College Dublin's highest honour, the Ulysses Medal, in 2015.

Wall Valley was named in recognition of Wall for her extensive research on soil biology in the McMurdo Dry Valleys of Antarctica, including spending 13 field seasons there at the time of the naming .

Other activities 
Wall chaired the DIVERSITAS-International Biodiversity Observation (2001-2002) and also the Global Litter Invertebrate Decomposition Experiment. In addition Wall also co-chaired the Millennium Development Goals Committee of the Millennium Ecosystem Assessment. Wall co-chaired AAAS Panel on What we know about Climate Change Initiative (2013-2014). Wall is a member of one of the President's Council of Advisors on Science and Technology (PCAST) working groups. She is a member of the UNESCO International Hydrological Program US National Committee. Wall has been a Board Member of the Island Press and the World Resources Institute.

References

External links 
 
 Biography at Colorado State University

Year of birth missing (living people)
Living people
University of Kentucky alumni
Colorado State University faculty
20th-century American women scientists
21st-century American women scientists
Kentucky women biologists
Kentucky women in education
American women biologists
Fellows of the Ecological Society of America
American women academics